The Tartu Credit Center Massacre  was the mass murder of 19 people in the basement of the former Credit Center in Tartu on 14 January 1919.

The execution was carried out just before the Bolsheviks withdrew from Tartu by order of the Estonian Counter-Revolutionary Commission of the Commune of the Working People of Estonia. Its best-known victim was Platon, the first Estonian Orthodox bishop.

Historical Context 

The massacre of the Tartu Credit Union is located in the context of a policy of intimidation and destruction behind the Red Army, which is called Red Terror. The basis of the Red Terror in Soviet Russia was the Decree of 5 September 1918 on the Red Terror, which ordered the shooting of so-called enemies of the people or their placement in concentration camps. On the territory of Estonia, the Red Terror was carried out between 1918 and 1919 on the territory under the control of the Commune of the Working People of Estonia.

Massacre 
Immediately before the liberation of Tartu by the 2nd Division of the Estonian Army, the chairman of the Tartu Counter-Revolutionary Commission, Aleksander Kull, ordered the execution of 19 people detained in the basement of the former Tartu Credit Centre on Kompanii Street. Among those to be executed were Orthodox Bishop Platon, two Orthodox high priests (Nikolai Bezanitsky and Mikhail Bleive), two Lutheran pastors - Professor of Theology at the University of Tartu (Gotthilft Traugott Hahn and Moritz Wilhelm Paul Schwartz), three landowners, one manor owner, Arnold Johann Heinrich von Tideböhl, Commissioner of the Baltic Germans in Tartu, a lawyer, a potter, a student and even a Russian Red Army soldier.

The death sentence was carried out by a penitentiary formed from the fighters of the 2nd Viljandi Estonian Communist Hunt, led by Commissioner Aleksander Jea. The same squad had carried out executions in Elistvere municipality two days earlier. It had a total of 117 men.

After the massacre, Kull and his subordinates left Võru on an armored train, which was still under the control of the Red Army. Before that, the Bolsheviks fled the city and arrested Vilde, an accountant of the city government, and Arved Eichhorn, a city architect, on Promenaadi Street, who was taken to Pepler Street for shooting. Eichhorn survived the shooting but was seriously injured.

According to the Bolshevik newspaper Edasi, published in Võru on 16 January 1919, the executions were motivated by the fact that on the morning of 14 January, the chairman of the Committee for Combating the Counter-Revolution, Aleksander Kull, had been tried to be killed with poisoned coffee.  However, the historian Taavi Minnik has considered the executions primarily as revenge for the activities of Julius Kuperjanov's partisans.

The security team left their posts after serving lunch to the detainees on 14 January. Shortly afterwards, about 200 inmates in the former credit union building were able to be released with the help of city residents.

Victims Discovered 
It is not clear exactly who discovered the victims of the execution in the basement.

One of the first top surgeons to visit the scene, Wolfgang von Reyher, a student and longtime assistant to renowned medical scientist Werner Zoege von Manteuffel, found that the victims had been taken one by one to a basement selected for execution, where they were murdered by a shot to the head. Subsequent victims were thrown to the previous bodies and killed in the same manner.

Subsequent forensic examinations revealed that some of those killed had been beaten, stabbed and repeatedly shot before being killed. Bishop Platon had been stabbed seven times in the chest with a bayonet; There were also traces of beating on his body, for example, a trace of a fist was detected in his right place. However, the high Orthodox priests Bezanitsky and Bleive were killed in one shot.   The outer garments and footwear had been confiscated from those killed, some witnesses said before the execution.

Media Coverage 
Reports of the massacre were spreading rapidly in Estonia through the press. Tartu Postimees published a report about the killings on the front page of the next day. Päevaleht, published in Tallinn, published a long news about the massacre in Tartu the next day, giving the names of the victims.  

As soon as reports of the "Tartu Credit Union massacre" reached Paris, Eduard Laaman, the press attaché of the Estonian delegation at the Paris Peace Conference, sent information about it to the world's leading newspapers. It is alleged that the message he sent was published only in the New York Herald.

Eduard Vilde, the head of the Estonian News Office in Copenhagen, informed the Western world about the massacres organized by the Bolsheviks in Tartu and Rakvere.

Memorial 

Today, the memorial plaque is marked on the wall of the house on Kompanii Street 3.  In addition, the 2003 In the wall of the same building Tõnis Paberiti made a bronze bas-relief of Bishop Platon.

In the Orthodox Cathedral of Paris, a prayer of soul was held in memory of Bishop Platon and the other victims on the orders of Minister of Foreign Affairs Jaan Poska, the head of the Estonian delegation to the Paris Peace Conference. All representatives of the Estonian delegation, led by Poska, were at the service.

During the interwar period, the victims of the massacre were reminded with prayers at the former Tartu Credit Union building. This tradition was initiated in January 1922 by the clergy of the Tartu Orthodox Church, and from January 1923 the Lutheran clergy joined them and the prayers acquired an ecumenical character. Aleksander Paulus, the metropolitan of Tallinn and all of Estonia, and later the Lutheran Church of the Estonian Gospel, always took part in these prayers. At the end of the 1920s, prayers and memorial services for victims were held on January 14 in Tartu Orthodox and Lutheran churches. With the participation of the representatives of both churches, a committee for commemorating the victims of the basement of the Tartu Credit Fund was formed, under the leadership of which the cellar where the massacre was committed was rebuilt into a memorial chapel. It was consecrated on January 14, 1931.

The victims of the Credit Union massacre have also been commemorated during the events marking the anniversary of the liberation of Tartu after regaining independence.

Orthodox clergy killed in the massacre - Bishop Platon, high priests Nikolai Bezanitsky and Mikhail Bleive - have been declared saints.

See also 
NKVD prisoner massacre in Tartu

References 

1919 in Estonia
History of Tartu
Massacres in 1919
Massacres in Estonia
Russian war crimes in Estonia
Soviet war crimes